Judith Wiesner was the defending champion but lost in the first round to Lenka Cenková.

Barbara Paulus won when Sandra Cecchini was forced to retire in the first game of the final.

Seeds
A champion seed is indicated in bold text while text in italics indicates the round in which that seed was eliminated.

  Barbara Paulus (champion)
  Judith Wiesner (first round)
  Elena Pampoulova (first round)
  Henrieta Nagyová (second round)
  Sandra Dopfer (second round)
  Flora Perfetti (second round)
  María Sánchez Lorenzo (first round)
  Janette Husárová (second round)

Draw

External links
 1996 Meta Styrian Open draw

WTA Austrian Open
1996 WTA Tour